Yūji, Yuji or Yuuji is a common masculine Japanese given name.

Possible writings
Yūji can be written using different combinations of kanji characters. Some examples: 

勇二, "courage, 2"
勇次, "courage, next"
裕二, "abundant, 2"
祐二, "help, 2"
祐次, "help, next"
雄治, "masculine, govern"
雄二, "masculine, 2"
悠児, "permanence, child"
悠二, "permanence, 2"
祐史, "to help, history"
祐司, "to help, rule"
裕司, "abundant, rule"

The name can also be written in hiragana ゆうじ or katakana ユウジ.

Yuji is a separate given name.

諭二, "to persuade, 2"
諭次, "to persuade, next"
愉二, "pleased, 2"
諭次, "pleased,next"
愈一, "more and more, 1"
愈次, "more and more,next"

And can also be written in hiragana ゆじ or katakana ユジ.

Notable people with the name
, Japanese television journalist and actor
, Japanese musician and songwriter
, Japanese manga artist
, Japanese Paralympic swimmer
, Japanese professional wrestler
, Japanese high jumper
, Japanese professional rock climber
, Japanese video game designer
, Japanese racing driver
, Japanese ice hockey player
, Japanese golfer
, Japanese baseball player
, Japanese ice hockey player and coach
, Japanese manga artist
, Japanese manga artist
, Japanese cartoonist
, Japanese Paralympic judoka
, Japanese Nordic combined skier
, Japanese footballer
, Japanese actor and voice actor 
, Japanese footballer
, Japanese composer
, Japanese shogi player
, Japanese information scientist
, Japanese actor, voice actor, and sound supervisor
, Japanese ski mountaineer and trail runner
, Japanese professional wrestler
, Japanese video game designer and programmer
, Japanese long-distance runner
, Japanese football player
, Japanese volleyball player
, Japanese baseball player
, Japanese footballer
, Japanese footballer
, Japanese rugby union player
, Japanese footballer
, Japanese voice actor
, Japanese sprint canoeist
, Japanese footballer
, Japanese animator
, Japanese footballer and manager
Alfonso Yuji Cortez (born 2003), Japanese-born Singaporean musician and artist

Fictional characters
, protagonist of the Grisaia visual novel series
, protagonist of the light novel series Shakugan no Shana
, a character from Haikyu!! with the position of captain and outside hitter from Johzenji High
, protagonist of the manga series Jujutsu Kaisen
, recurring character in the manga series Gambling Apocalypse: Kaiji.

See also
47077 Yuji, a main-belt asteroid

Japanese masculine given names